The first season of the American police procedural drama NCIS was originally broadcast between September 23, 2003, and May 25, 2004, on CBS. The first season dealt with introducing the characters and their strengths, skills, and weaknesses. Three recurring characters are also introduced: the main foe for the first two seasons, Ari Haswari; Special Agent Timothy McGee and Jimmy Palmer who replaces Gerald Jackson, Ducky's assistant, after he was shot. The season also introduces Sasha Alexander as Special Agent Caitlin Todd who serves as Special Agent Vivian Blackadder's (Robyn Lively) replacement, who was a member of Gibbs' team during the two-part JAG backdoor pilot.

Cast

Main 
 Mark Harmon as Leroy Jethro Gibbs, NCIS Supervisory Special Agent (SSA) of the Major Case Response Team (MCRT) assigned to Washington's Navy Yard
 Sasha Alexander as Caitlin Todd, NCIS Special Agent and former Secret Service Special Agent assigned to the security detail of the President of the United States
 Michael Weatherly as Anthony DiNozzo, NCIS Senior Special Agent, second in command of MCRT
 Pauley Perrette as Abby Sciuto, Forensic Specialist for NCIS
 David McCallum as Dr. Donald "Ducky" Mallard, Chief Medical Examiner for NCIS

Recurring 
 Alan Dale as Thomas Morrow, NCIS Director
 Alicia Coppola as Faith Coleman, JAG Commander
 Joe Spano as Tobias Fornell, FBI Senior Special Agent
 Pancho Demmings as Gerald Jackson, Assistant Medical Examiner for NCIS and Ducky's first assistant
 Patrick Labyorteaux as Bud Roberts, JAG Lieutenant from Falls Church
 Kent Shocknek as Guy Ross, ZNN news anchor
 Sean Murray as Timothy McGee, NCIS Probationary Special Agent who works at the Norfolk Naval Base
 Jessica Steen as Paula Cassidy, NCIS Senior Special Agent assigned to Guantanamo (GTMO or Gitmo) Bay Detention Camp in Cuba
 Tim Kelleher as Chris Pacci, NCIS Special Agent 
 Rudolf Martin as Ari Haswari, rogue Mossad Agent
 Brian Dietzen as Jimmy Palmer, Assistant Medical Examiner for NCIS and temporary replacement for Gerald after he gets shot

Guest appearances 
 Adam Baldwin as Michael Rainer, Navy Commander
 Eric Ladin as P.O. Thompson

Episodes

DVD release

References

General references 
 
 
 

2003 American television seasons
2004 American television seasons
NCIS 01